Joseph William Castillo (born March 30, 1966) is an American musician and songwriter. He is best known for being the drummer of the hard rock band Queens of the Stone Age from 2002 to 2012. He is currently a member of Circle Jerks, The Bronx and Zakk Sabbath, with former bands including Danzig, Wasted Youth, Eagles of Death Metal, California Breed, Sugartooth, Zilch, and Scott Weiland and the Wildabouts.
 
From 1994 to 2002, Castillo was the drummer of Danzig, recording three studio albums with the band before joining Queens of the Stone Age in 2002 to tour in support of their breakthrough album, Songs for the Deaf. He recorded two albums, Lullabies to Paralyze (2005), Era Vulgaris (2007), and half of ...Like Clockwork (2013) before being fired by founding member Josh Homme during the process.

Since leaving Queens of the Stone Age and Homme side project Eagles of Death Metal in 2012, Castillo joined California Breed, replacing founding member Jason Bonham, joined Scott Weiland and the Wildabouts, touring with the band before the singer's death in 2015, and joined three groups with former Queens of the Stone Age bandmate Nick Oliveri: supergroups Bloodclot (with John Joseph of Cro-Mags and Todd Youth, former Danzig and Murphy's Law guitarist), Royale Daemons (with Wino), and historic punk band Bl'ast. Castillo also has joined Zakk Wylde-led Black Sabbath cover band Zakk Sabbath.

Musical career
A native of Gardena, California, Castillo began playing drums at age 15, when his grandmother loaned him the money to buy a drum kit. His playing is influenced by War, Al Green, Led Zeppelin, the Rolling Stones, and Black Flag. He started off his drumming career by joining the Los Angeles punk band Wasted Youth in 1984. After recording two albums and several tours, he left Wasted Youth and joined Sugartooth in 1991. During the summer of 1994, he formed a short-lived punk rock band called Chronic Halitosis. They played punk covers of bands like Misfits and Black Flag.

In 1994, Castillo left Sugartooth and joined Danzig, having turned down previous offers from Slayer and Suicidal Tendencies. He worked as Chuck Biscuit's drum tech circa '90-'93 and finally replaced him as live drummer on the '94 tours, following the release of Danzig 4. From that point on, he was (with exception for Glenn) the only constant Danzig member for almost ten years, performing all percussion duties on Blackacidevil (1996), Satan's Child (1999) and I Luciferi (2002). In 1996, he was featured on Robert Trujillo's solo album, and in 1998 he joined Zilch. He replaced Goatsnake's original drummer after his departure in 2001, but that was short lived when they split up shortly after. Castillo auditioned for Guns N' Roses in 1997, but did not join the band. In 2001 he did backing vocals and drums for some tracks on Son of Sam's album Songs From The Earth.

Castillo joined Queens of the Stone Age without an audition, playing through half a song (Avon) at a last-minute rehearsal when frontman Josh Homme reportedly walked out of the room, and returned saying "I just fired the drummer. The tour starts tomorrow," offering Castillo the gig, for which he remained for 10 years. Castillo also played on side projects including Mark Lanegan's solo album Bubblegum, Desert Sessions Vol. 9 & 10 and Eagles of Death Metal's second and third albums Death by Sexy (2006) & Heart On (2008), touring with the latter.

After leaving QotSA in 2012, Castillo has had great demand as a session player, touring musician as well as becoming a proper band member in numerous projects, as aforementioned.

Notably, on June 25, 2017, Castillo, along with Trent Reznor, Mariqueen Maandig Reznor, Robin Finck, Atticus Ross, and Alessandro Cortini appeared as "The Nine Inch Nails" in Episode 8 of Twin Peaks: The Return on Showtime, performing an alternate live rendition of the song "She's Gone Away" which previously appeared on Nine Inch Nails' 2016 album "Not the Actual Events"

In 2018, Joey joined The Bronx, after founding member Jorma Vik left to play with Castillo's former band Eagles of Death Metal. The following year, he toured in a session capacity with The Hives.

In July 2021, hardcore punk band Circle Jerks announced that Castillo would be their new drummer and he would join them on their reunion tour to celebrate the 40th anniversary of their 1980 album, Group Sex. The tour was originally announced in 2019 and planned for 2020 however it was postponed until 2021 due to the COVID-19 pandemic.

Personal life
Castillo currently resides in Joshua Tree, California with his three children and his wife.

Equipment
Castillo currently uses Tama drums, pedals and hardware, Zildjian cymbals, Vater sticks and LP equipment. In 2018, he switched back to Tama after over ten years with Oxnard, California's Drum Workshop and five years with San Pedro's Q Drum Co. Pre-QOTSA he was known to use Tama drums, Paiste cymbals and Easton sticks.

Castillo is famous for his use of the LP Jam block. The tone of the jam block appears solo at the outset of the Queens of the Stone Age single "Little Sister" from the album Lullabies to Paralyze, Castillo's first studio album with the band.

Castillo also has two drumkits which belonged to Chuck Biscuits and considers them his most prized possessions.

2018-Present

Tama Star Maple Drums (Gloss Natural Curly Maple Finh) 
26"x14" Bass Drum
15"x12" Rack Tom
20"x18" Floor Tom 
14"x8" Q Drum Co. Aluminum Plate Snare

Tama Hardware
Tama HC52F "The Classic Stand" (3x)
Tama HH915D Speed Cobra 910 Hi-Hat Stand or HH55F "The Classic"
Tama HP910LN Speed Cobra 910 single pedalZildjian Cymbals15" K Sweet Hi-Hats
20" K Dark Crash Thin
24" Z Heavy Power Ride
21" K Crash/RideVater “ROCK” DrumsticksRemo DrumheadsSnare - Emperor X 
Toms - Coated Emperors (Batter) / Clear Ambassadors (Resonant)
Bass - Coated Powerstroke P3 (Batter) / Smooth White and Ebony Powerstroke P3s (Resonant)

Castillo has also been seen using Ebony Pinstripes and clear Controlled Sounds on his toms.

2013-2018Q Drum Co drums (Clear seamless Acrylic or Black Stain Mahogany)
26"x14" Bass Drum
14"x10" Rack Tom
18"x16" Floor Tom
14"x8" Aluminum Plate SnareDW HardwareDW 6710 straight cymbal stands (3x)
DW 5000 Hi-Hat Stand
DW 9000 bass pedalZildjian CymbalsZildjian 24-inch K Light ride
Zildjian 21-inch K Crash Ride
Zildjian 20-inch K Crash
Zildjian 16-inch K Light Hi HatsVater SticksVater Rock, Power 5B and Power 3ARemo HeadsSnare: Remo Emperor X 
Toms: Remo Clear Emperor's 
Bass: Remo Clear Powerstroke III with Falam Slam

QOTSA Era Gear (2002–2012)

Reissue tours equipment (2010–2012)DW Drums Jazz Series (Silver Sparkle)
24"x16" Bass Drum
14"x10" Mounted Tom
16"x16" Floor Tom (not used in 2011)
18"x16" Floor Tom
14"x8" Steel Sonor Snare formerly owned by Chuck BiscuitsDW HardwareDW 6710 straight cymbal stands (x3)
DW 6500 Hi-Hat Stand
DW 9300 Snare Stand (x2)
DW 9000 Bass Drum Pedal
DW 9100AL Airlift throneZildjian CymbalsZildjian 24" A Medium Ride (2010) 24-inch K Light ride (2011)
Zildjian 21" K Crash Ride
Zildjian 19" K Custom Hybrid crash
Zildjian 14.25" K Custom Hybrid Hi-HatsVic Firth SticksVic Firth Extreme 5B sticksRemo HeadsSnare: Remo Controlled Sound Clear
Toms: Remo Controlled Sound
Bass: Remo Clear Powerstroke III with Falam SlamLatin PercussionLP160 Cyclops Tambourine Brass and Steel (as configured below)
LP1208-K Stealth Jam Block
LP Matador Wood Bongos Black/Chrome

Heart On (Eagles of Death Metal) tour equipment (2008–2012)DW Drums Classic Series (Brown to Black Duco)
22"x14" Bass Drum
16x16" Floor Tom
14"x8" Steel Sonor Snare formerly owned by Chuck BiscuitsDW HardwareDW 6710 straight cymbal stands (x3)
DW 6500 Hi-Hat Stand
DW 9300 Snare Stand
DW 9000 Bass Drum Pedal
DW 9100AL Airlift throneZildjian CymbalsZildjian 16" Oriental China
Zildjian 15" A Crash
Zildjian 14" New Beat Hi-HatsVic Firth SticksVic Firth Extreme 5B sticksRemo HeadsSnare: Remo Controlled Sound Clear
Toms: Remo Controlled Sound
Bass: Remo Clear Powerstroke III with Falam SlamLatin PercussionLP160 Cyclops Tambourine Steel (on hi-hat) and Brass (bass drum mounted)
LP1207 Jam Block (on stand)

Era Vulgaris tour equipment (2007–2008)
Castillo used larger sized tom drums than ever before, while moving to a smaller bass drum, the opposite of the Lullabies-era configuration. He continued using Vic Firth sticks, DW drums with OCDP clear acrylic shells, DW pedals and hardware, but switched from using Paiste to Zildjian cymbals. DW Drums22"x18" Bass Drum with rail consolette cymbal mount for Cup Chime
14"x12" Mounted Concert Tom 
18"x16" Floor Concert Tom
14"x6.5" Cast Bronze Snare with wood top hoopDW Hardware5000TD Delta3 Turbo Single Bass Drum Pedal, 9000 Series Pedal (2008)
5500TD Delta Turbo Hi-Hat Stand
9300 Snare Drum Stand (x2)
6710 Straight Cymbal Stand (x3)
9101 Low Drum ThroneVic Firth SticksVic Firth American Classic Series X5A & X5BZildjian Cymbals13.25" (early 2007), 14.25" Zildjian K Custom Hybrid Hi-Hats
17" Zildjian K Custom Hybrid Crash (early 2007), 19" K Custom Hybrid Crash
24" Zildjian K Light Ride
18" Zildjian K Crash Ride (early 2007), 21" K Prototype Crash
18" Zildjian K China (on song for song basis)
13" Paiste Mega Cup Chime (2007)Remo HeadsSnare: Remo Emperor X (2007), Remo Clear Controlled Sound (2008)
Toms: Remo Controlled Sound
Bass: Remo Controlled Sound with Falam SlamLatin PercussionLP160 Cyclops Tambourine Brass and Steel (as configured below)
LP1207 Stealth Jam Block (Black)

Additional
Joey also used Rtom Moongel on Toms and Snare and Remo 0 ring on Snare

Lullabies To Paralyze tour equipment (2005–2006)
For the Lullabies tour, Castillo continued to use DW drums, Paiste cymbals and Remo heads. Though during this tour he started using Vic Firth sticks instead of Vater. Joey also dropped his second floor tom and LP bongos during this tour and added on an LP jamblock to his drumkit. From this tour and on, he would use the toms to play "Better Living Through Chemistry" during the verses. During the Lullabies tour Joey started removing his bottom heads on both his toms
To achieve the "concert tom" sound which gave his toms a punchy, fatter soundDW Drums26"x20" Bass Drum
13"x10" Rack Tom
16"x14" Floor Tom
14"x6.5" Cast Bronze Snare with wood top hoopDW Hardware5000TD Delta3 Turbo Single Bass Drum Pedal
5500TD Delta Turbo Hi-Hat Stand
9300 Snare Drum Stand (x2)
6710 Straight Cymbal Stand (x3)
9101 Low Drum ThroneVic Firth SticksVic Firth American Classic Series X5BPaiste Cymbals14" 2002 Medium Hi-Hats
19" Black Rude Thin Crash
20" Black Rude Thin Crash
24" 2002 RideRemo HeadsSnare: CS Coated Power Dot on top or Emperor X, Remo Ambassador Snare Side on bottom
Toms: Coated Emperor tops, Clear Ambassador bottoms (Later in the tour Joey replaced the Coated Emperors with CS Clears on tops but removed the bottoms for the Concert Tom sound) 
Bass: Clear Powerstroke 3 on batter, DW Ambassador resonant sideLatin PercussionLP160 Cyclops Tambourine Brass (mounted off cymbal stand next to floor tom) and Steel (mounted on bass drum rim, interchanged with jam block)
LP1207 Jam Block (Red)

Additional
Joey also used Rtom Moongel on Toms and Snare and Remo 0 ring on Snare

Songs for the Deaf tour equipment (2002–2004)
Castillo used DW drums and hardware, Paiste cymbals and Remo heads during the Songs for the Deaf tour, occasionally using PDP kits for one-off performances.DW Drums (Ebony Satin Stain, Broken Glass)
24"x18" Bass Drum
13"x11" Rack Tom
16"x14" Floor Tom
18"x16" Floor Tom
14"x6.5" Cast Bronze Snare DrumDW Hardware5000TD Delta3 Turbo Single Bass Drum Pedal
5500TD Delta Turbo Hi-Hat Stand
9300 Snare Drum Stand (x2)
9710 Straight Cymbal Stand (x2)
9700 Straight/Boom Cymbal Stand
9101 Low Drum ThroneVater Sticks Vater Rock and Power 5APaiste Cymbals15" 2002 Sound Edge Hi-Hats
18" 2002 Medium Crash
20" 2002 Medium Crash
24" 2002 Ride
(All White by Lollapalooza 2003)Remo HeadsSnare: CS Coated Power Dot on top, Remo Ambassador Snare Side on bottom
Toms: Coated Emperor tops, Clear Ambassador bottoms
Bass: Clear Powerstroke 3 on batter, DW Ambassador resonant sideLatin Percussion'''
LP160 Cyclops Tambourine Brass
LP201A-2 Generation II Bongos

Discography

References

External links

LPmusic.com - LP Music page of Joey Castillo

1966 births
American people of Salvadoran descent
American rock drummers
Tambourine players
Queens of the Stone Age members
Danzig (band) members
People from Gardena, California
Living people
American heavy metal drummers
American punk rock drummers
20th-century American drummers
American male drummers
California Breed members
Goatsnake members
Zilch (band) members
Wasted Youth (American band) members
Eagles of Death Metal members